The 1984 Toronto Blue Jays season was the franchise's eighth season of Major League Baseball. It resulted in the Blue Jays finishing second in the American League East with a record of 89 wins and 73 losses.

Offseason
 November 14, 1983: Sil Campusano was signed by the Blue Jays as an amateur free agent.
 December 5, 1983: Kelly Gruber was drafted by the Blue Jays from the Cleveland Indians in the 1983 rule 5 draft.
 January 10, 1984: Dennis Lamp was signed as a free agent by the Blue Jays.

Regular season
 August 19, 1984: In a game against the Oakland Athletics, Cliff Johnson hit the 19th pinch home run of his career, breaking Jerry Lynch's record of 18.
 Jimmy Key set a team record for rookie pitchers by appearing in 63 games.
 Lloyd Moseby and Dave Collins each led the American League with 15 triples.
 Rance Mulliniks sets a team record by getting 8 consecutive hits.
 Dave Stieb finished second in the American League in strikeouts and ERA.

Opening Day starters
 Jim Clancy
 Jesse Barfield
 George Bell
 Dámaso García
 Alfredo Griffin
 Cliff Johnson
 Lloyd Moseby
 Rance Mulliniks
 Willie Upshaw
 Ernie Whitt

Season standings

Record vs. opponents

Notable transactions
 April 3, 1984: Rick Leach was signed as a free agent by the Blue Jays.
 May 8, 1984: Geno Petralli was purchased from the Blue Jays by the Cleveland Indians.
 May 16, 1984: Rob Ducey was signed by the Toronto Blue Jays as an amateur free agent. 
 June 4, 1984: Dane Johnson was drafted by the Blue Jays in the 2nd round of the 1984 Major League Baseball draft. Player signed June 21, 1984.

Roster

Game log

|- align="center" bgcolor="ffbbbb"
| 1 || April 4 || @ Mariners || 3 – 2 (10) || Stanton (1-0) || Lamp (0-1)  || || 43,200 || 0-1
|- align="center" bgcolor="bbffbb"
| 2 || April 5 || @ Mariners || 13 – 5 || Leal (1-0) || Beattie (0-1) || || 5,399 || 1-1
|- align="center" bgcolor="bbffbb"
| 3 || April 6 || @ Angels || 11 – 5 || Key (1-0) || Brown (0-1) || || 24,431 || 2-1
|- align="center" bgcolor="bbffbb"
| 4 || April 7 || @ Angels || 3 – 1 || Stieb (1-0) || Forsch (1-1) || Lamp (1) || 41,859 || 3-1
|- align="center" bgcolor="ffbbbb"
| 5 || April 8 || @ Angels || 4 – 3 || Sánchez (1-1) || Jackson (0-1) || || 24,095 || 3-2
|- align="center" bgcolor="ffbbbb"
| 6 || April 9 || @ Athletics || 4 – 3 || Caudill (1-0) || Lamp (0-2) || || 9,868 || 3-3
|- align="center" bgcolor="bbffbb"
| 7 || April 10 || @ Athletics || 3 – 0 || Leal (2-0) || Sorensen (1-1) || Jackson (1) || 7,226 || 4-3
|- align="center" bgcolor="bbffbb"
| 8 || April 13 || @ Rangers || 3 – 2 || Lamp (1-2) || Tobik (1-2) || Key (1) || 10,515 || 5-3
|- align="center" bgcolor="ffbbbb"
| 9 || April 14 || @ Rangers || 6 – 2 || Hough (1-1) || Clancy (0-1) || || 9,852 || 5-4
|- align="center" bgcolor="bbffbb"
| 10 || April 15 || @ Rangers || 2 – 1 || Lamp (2-2) || Stewart (0-3) || || 12,583 || 6-4
|- align="center" bgcolor="bbffbb"
| 11 || April 17 || Orioles || 3 – 2 || Key (2-0) || Martinez (0-1) || Lamp (2) || 35,602 || 7-4
|- align="center" bgcolor="bbffbb"
| 12 || April 18 || Orioles || 7 – 1 || Stieb (2-0) || Palmer (0-2) || || 13,489 || 8-4
|- align="center" bgcolor="bbffbb"
| 13 || April 19 || Orioles || 2 – 1 || Clancy (1-1) || McGregor (1-3) || || 14,323 || 9-4
|- align="center" bgcolor="ffbbbb"
| 14 || April 20 || Angels || 10 – 6 (13) || Sánchez (2-1) || Acker (0-1)  || || 37,241 || 9-5
|- align="center" bgcolor="ffbbbb"
| 15 || April 21 || Angels || 8 – 4 || Romanick (2-1) || Gott (0-1) || || 44,164 || 9-6
|- align="center" bgcolor="ffbbbb"
| 16 || April 22 || Angels || 9 – 6 || Slaton (1-0) || Key (2-1) || Kaufman (1) || 16,462 || 9-7
|- align="center" bgcolor="bbffbb"
| 17 || April 23 || Mariners || 8 – 5 || Stieb (3-0) || Langston (1-1) || Jackson (2) || 13,330 || 10-7
|- align="center" bgcolor="ffbbbb"
| 18 || April 24 || Mariners || 4 – 2 || Beard (1-0) || Clancy (1-2) || || 12,398 || 10-8
|- align="center" bgcolor="bbffbb"
| 19 || April 25 || Athletics || 11 – 0 || Leal (3-0) || Conroy (0-2) || || 15,434 || 11-8
|- align="center" bgcolor="ffbbbb"
| 20 || April 26 || Athletics || 7 – 4 || Warren (3-2) || Gott (0-2) || Burgmeier (2) || 16,488 || 11-9
|- align="center" bgcolor="bbffbb"
| 21 || April 27 || @ Royals || 1 – 0 || Alexander (1-0) || Gubicza (0-2) || Lamp (3) || 16,435 || 12-9
|- align="center" bgcolor="bbffbb"
| 22 || April 28 || @ Royals || 6 – 0 || Stieb (4-0) || Saberhagen (1-1) || || 18,194 || 13-9
|- align="center" bgcolor="bbbbbb"
| -- || April 29 || @ Royals || colspan=6|Postponed (rain) Rescheduled for July 23
|- align="center" bgcolor="bbbbbb"
| -- || April 30 || Rangers || colspan=6|Postponed (wind) Rescheduled for May 1
|-

|- align="center" bgcolor="bbffbb"
| 23 || May 1 || Rangers || 10 – 4 || Leal (4-0) || Tanana (2-3) || Lamp (4) || || 14-9
|- align="center" bgcolor="ffbbbb"
| 24 || May 1 || Rangers || 4 – 1 || Darwin (3-0) || Alexander (1-1) || || 13,159 || 14-10
|- align="center" bgcolor="bbffbb"
| 25 || May 2 || Rangers || 7 – 6 || Clancy (2-2) || Hough (1-4) || Lamp (5) || 13,274 || 15-10
|- align="center" bgcolor="bbffbb"
| 26 || May 4 || Royals || 4 – 3 (10)|| Stieb (5-0) || Huismann (0-2) || || 16,469 || 16-10
|- align="center" bgcolor="bbffbb"
| 27 || May 5 || Royals || 10 – 1 || Gott (1-2) || Jackson (0-3) || || 31,076 || 17-10
|- align="center" bgcolor="bbffbb"
| 28 || May 6 || Royals || 2 – 1 || Jackson (1-1) || Gura (4-1) || || 23,334 || 18-10
|- align="center" bgcolor="bbbbbb"
| -- || May 7 || @ Orioles || colspan=6|Postponed (wet grounds) Rescheduled for May 10
|- align="center" bgcolor="bbbbbb"
| -- || May 8 || @ Orioles || colspan=6|Postponed (rain) Rescheduled for May 9
|- align="center" bgcolor="ffbbbb"
| 29 || May 9 || @ Orioles || 7 – 4 || McGregor (4-3) || Clancy (2-3) || || || 18-11
|- align="center" bgcolor="ffbbbb"
| 30 || May 9 || @ Orioles || 7 – 3 || Martinez (1-3) || Key (2-2) || || 18,731 || 18-12
|- align="center" bgcolor="bbffbb"
| 31 || May 10 || @ Orioles || 4 – 3 (10)|| Jackson (2-1) || Martínez (1-1) || || 11,214 || 19-12
|- align="center" bgcolor="bbbbbb"
| -- || May 11 || @ Indians || colspan=6|Postponed (rain) Rescheduled for May 13
|- align="center" bgcolor="ffbbbb"
| 32 || May 12 || @ Indians || 8 – 4 || Blyleven (4-2) || Acker (0-2) || Camacho (4) || 11,066 || 19-13
|- align="center"
| 33 || May 13 || @ Indians || 4 – 4  (8) || colspan=3|Postponed (rain) Rescheduled for August 14 || 5,630 || 19-13
|- align="center" bgcolor="bbbbbb"
| -- || May 13 || @ Indians || colspan=6|Postponed (rain) Rescheduled for August 15
|- align="center" bgcolor="bbffbb"
| 34 || May 15 || @ Twins || 5 – 2 (10)|| Jackson (3-1) || Davis (2-3) || || 26,761 || 20-13
|- align="center" bgcolor="bbffbb"
| 35 || May 16 || @ Twins || 8 – 7 || Alexander (2-1) || Filson (3-1) || Acker (1) || 51,863 || 21-13
|- align="center" bgcolor="bbffbb"
| 36 || May 17 || White Sox || 3 – 2 || Jackson (4-1) || Hoyt (3-5) || Lamp (6) || 18,328 || 22-13
|- align="center" bgcolor="bbffbb"
| 37 || May 18 || White Sox || 4 – 3 || Clancy (3-3) || Burns (2-2) || Key (2) || 19,507 || 23-13
|- align="center" bgcolor="bbffbb"
| 38 || May 19 || White Sox || 1 – 0 || Gott (2-2) || Seaver (4-3) || Lamp (7) || 28,382 || 24-13
|- align="center" bgcolor="ffbbbb"
| 39 || May 20 || White Sox || 3 – 0 || Dotson (6-2) || Stieb (5-1) || || 26,347 || 24-14
|- align="center" bgcolor="bbffbb"
| 40 || May 21 || Twins || 3 – 2 || Alexander (3-1) || Davis (2-4) || || 43,347 || 25-14
|- align="center" bgcolor="bbffbb"
| 41 || May 22 || Twins || 3 – 2 || Jackson (5-1) || Smithson (6-4) || || 17,287 || 26-14
|- align="center" bgcolor="bbffbb"
| 42 || May 23 || Twins || 4 – 1 || Clancy (4-3) || Viola (4-5) || Lamp (8) || 17,189 || 27-14
|- align="center" bgcolor="bbffbb"
| 43 || May 25 || Indians || 5 – 1 || Stieb (6-1) || Heaton (2-4) || || 18,195 || 28-14
|- align="center" bgcolor="bbffbb"
| 44 || May 26 || Indians || 2 – 1 || Alexander (4-1) || Farr (0-3) || Key (3) || 22,283 || 29-14
|- align="center" bgcolor="bbffbb"
| 45 || May 27 || Indians || 6 – 1 || Leal (5-0) || Sutcliffe (3-4) || || || 30-14
|- align="center" bgcolor="bbffbb"
| 46 || May 27 || Indians || 6 – 5 || Jackson (6-1) || Camacho (1-4) || || 37,097 || 31-14
|- align="center" bgcolor="bbbbbb"
| -- || May 28 || @ White Sox || colspan=6|Postponed (rain) Rescheduled for August 30
|- align="center" bgcolor="ffbbbb"
| 47 || May 29 || @ White Sox || 8 – 1 || Hoyt (4-5) || Clancy (4-4) || || 19,603 || 31-15
|- align="center" bgcolor="bbffbb"
| 48 || May 30 || @ White Sox || 2 – 1 || Stieb (7-1) || Burns (2-4) || Key (4) || 23,490 || 32-15
|-

|- align="center" bgcolor="bbffbb"
| 49 || June 1 || Yankees || 10 – 2 || Alexander (5-1) || Fontenot (1-5) || || 30,586 || 33-15
|- align="center" bgcolor="bbffbb"
| 50 || June 2 || Yankees || 9 – 8 (10)|| Lamp (3-2) || Christiansen (1-2) || || 42,269 || 34-15
|- align="center" bgcolor="ffbbbb"
| 51 || June 3 || Yankees || 15 – 2 || Niekro (8-3) || Clancy (4-5) || || 33,077 || 34-16
|- align="center" bgcolor="ffbbbb"
| 52 || June 4 || @ Tigers || 6 – 3 (10)|| López (5-0) || Key (2-3) || || 26,733 || 34-17
|- align="center" bgcolor="bbffbb"
| 53 || June 5 || @ Tigers || 8 – 4 || Acker (1-2) || Abbott (2-2) || || 35,983 || 35-17
|- align="center" bgcolor="bbffbb"
| 54 || June 6 || @ Tigers || 6 – 3 || Leal (6-0) || Petry (8-3) || || 38,167 || 36-17
|- align="center" bgcolor="ffbbbb"
| 55 || June 7 || @ Tigers || 5 – 3 || Morris (11-2) || Clancy (4-6) || || 40,879 || 36-18
|- align="center" bgcolor="ffbbbb"
| 56 || June 8 || @ Yankees || 4 – 3 (11)|| Righetti (2-0) || Acker (1-3) || || 20,252 || 36-19
|- align="center" bgcolor="ffbbbb"
| 57 || June 9 || @ Yankees || 2 – 1 || Guidry (5-4) || Stieb (7-2) || || 20,661 || 36-20
|- align="center" bgcolor="ffbbbb"
| 58 || June 10 || @ Yankees || 5 – 3 || Christiansen (2-2) || Alexander (5-2) || Righetti (7) || 41,018 || 36-21
|- align="center" bgcolor="ffbbbb"
| 59 || June 11 || Tigers || 5 – 4 || Rozema (2-0) || Leal (6-1) || Hernández (10) || 35,062 || 36-22
|- align="center" bgcolor="bbffbb"
| 60 || June 12 || Tigers || 12 – 3 || Clancy (5-6) || Morris (11-3) || || 40,437 || 37-22
|- align="center" bgcolor="bbffbb"
| 61 || June 13 || Tigers || 7 – 3 || Stieb (8-2) || Wilcox (7-4) || || 34,122 || 38-22
|- align="center" bgcolor="bbffbb"
| 62 || June 15 || Red Sox || 4 – 3 (11)|| Lamp (4-2) || Clear (5-1) || || 30,065 || 39-22
|- align="center" bgcolor="bbffbb"
| 63 || June 16 || Red Sox || 7 – 0 || Leal (7-1) || Hurst (8-5) || || 31,278 || 40-22
|- align="center" bgcolor="bbffbb"
| 64 || June 17 || Red Sox || 5 – 3 || Clancy (6-6) || Gale (1-1) || Jackson (3) || 28,396 || 41-22
|- align="center" bgcolor="ffbbbb"
| 65 || June 19 || Brewers || 6 – 5 || Fingers (1-2) || Key (2-4) || || 32,210 || 41-23
|- align="center" bgcolor="ffbbbb"
| 66 || June 20 || Brewers || 5 – 4 || Tellmann (2-1) || Alexander (5-3) || || 31,282 || 41-24
|- align="center" bgcolor="bbffbb"
| 67 || June 21 || @ Red Sox || 5 – 2 || Leal (8-1) || Nipper (0-2) || || 18,372 || 42-24
|- align="center" bgcolor="ffbbbb"
| 68 || June 22 || @ Red Sox || 8 – 1 || Clemens (3-1) || Clancy (6-7) || || 23,167 || 42-25
|- align="center" bgcolor="bbffbb"
| 69 || June 23 || @ Red Sox || 9 – 3 || Gott (3-2) || Gale (1-2) || || 27,689 || 43-25
|- align="center" bgcolor="ffbbbb"
| 70 || June 24 || @ Red Sox || 5 – 3 (10)|| Stanley (2-6) || Lamp (4-3) || || 32,521 || 43-26
|- align="center" bgcolor="ffbbbb"
| 71 || June 25 || @ Brewers || 2 – 1 || Cocanower (6-6) || Alexander (5-4) || Fingers (13) || || 43-27
|- align="center" bgcolor="ffbbbb"
| 72 || June 25 || @ Brewers || 9 – 4 || McClure (2-3) || Acker (1-4) || || 15,088 || 43-28
|- align="center" bgcolor="ffbbbb"
| 73 || June 26 || @ Brewers || 6 – 3 || Sutton (5-7) || Leal (8-2) || Fingers (14) || 19,068 || 43-29
|- align="center" bgcolor="ffbbbb"
| 74 || June 27 || @ Brewers || 5 – 1 || Porter (6-3) || Clancy (6-8) || Tellmann (1) || 31,141 || 43-30
|- align="center" bgcolor="bbffbb"
| 75 || June 28 || Athletics || 9 – 6 || Gott (4-2) || Atherton (5-4) || || 30,213 || 44-30
|- align="center" bgcolor="ffbbbb"
| 76 || June 29 || Athletics || 2 – 1 || Burris (7-3) || Stieb (8-3) || Caudill (16) || 25,280 || 44-31
|- align="center" bgcolor="bbffbb"
| 77 || June 30 || Athletics || 6 – 1 || Alexander (6-4) || Krueger (5-4) || || 36,176 || 45-31
|-

|- align="center" bgcolor="bbffbb"
| 78 || July 1 || Athletics || 7 – 6 || Acker (2-4) || Atherton (5-5) || Jackson (4) || 35,046 || 46-31
|- align="center" bgcolor="ffbbbb"
| 79 || July 2 || Angels || 6 – 3 || Witt (8-7) || Clancy (6-9) || Aase (1) || 29,227 || 46-32
|- align="center" bgcolor="bbffbb"
| 80 || July 3 || Angels || 4 – 0 || Gott (5-2) || John (4-7) || || 26,255 || 47-32
|- align="center" bgcolor="bbffbb"
| 81 || July 4 || Angels || 6 – 3 || Stieb (9-3) || Romanick (8-9) || || 24,330 || 48-32
|- align="center" bgcolor="bbffbb"
| 82 || July 5 || Mariners || 10 – 8 || Alexander (7-4) || Beattie (8-8) || Jackson (5) || 22,353 || 49-32
|- align="center" bgcolor="bbffbb"
| 83 || July 6 || Mariners || 9 – 2 || Leal (9-2) || Langston (6-7) || || 22,385 || 50-32
|- align="center" bgcolor="ffbbbb"
| 84 || July 7 || Mariners || 8 – 4 || Moore (4-6) || Clancy (6-10) || Stanton (5) || 33,475 || 50-33
|- align="center" bgcolor="ffbbbb"
| 85 || July 8 || Mariners || 7 – 1 || Beattie (9-8) || Gott (5-3) || Vande Berg (4) || 30,070 || 50-34
|- align="center" bgcolor="ffbbbb"
| 86 || July 12 || @ Athletics || 7 – 4 || Krueger (6-5) || Lamp (4-4) || Caudill (19) || 16,066 || 50-35
|- align="center" bgcolor="bbffbb"
| 87 || July 13 || @ Athletics || 6 – 3 || Leal (10-2) || Burris (8-4) || Jackson (6) || 17,172 || 51-35
|- align="center" bgcolor="bbffbb"
| 88 || July 14 || @ Athletics || 2 – 1 || Stieb (10-3) || Caudill (8-2) || || 22,048 || 52-35
|- align="center" bgcolor="bbffbb"
| 89 || July 15 || @ Athletics || 6 – 3 || Clancy (7-10) || Young (2-1) || Jackson (7) || 24,044 || 53-35
|- align="center" bgcolor="ffbbbb"
| 90 || July 16 || @ Angels || 3 – 0 || Slaton (3-3) || Gott (5-4) || || 24,890 || 53-36
|- align="center" bgcolor="ffbbbb"
| 91 || July 17 || @ Angels || 5 – 3 || Witt (10-7) || Acker (2-5) || Aase (2) || 27,176 || 53-37
|- align="center" bgcolor="bbffbb"
| 92 || July 18 || @ Angels || 8 – 2 || Leal (11-2) || Zahn (9-7) || || 28,634 || 54-37
|- align="center" bgcolor="bbffbb"
| 93 || July 19 || @ Mariners || 8 – 1 || Stieb (11-3) || Vande Berg (6-9) || || 7,489 || 55-37
|- align="center" bgcolor="bbffbb"
| 94 || July 20 || @ Mariners || 12 – 7 || Acker (3-5) || Mirabella (1-4) || || 8,246 || 56-37
|- align="center" bgcolor="ffbbbb"
| 95 || July 21 || @ Mariners || 9 – 3 || Barojas (5-3) || Lamp (4-5) || || 14,516 || 56-38
|- align="center" bgcolor="bbffbb"
| 96 || July 22 || @ Mariners || 5 – 3 || Alexander (8-4) || Langston (8-8) || Jackson (8) || 7,263 || 57-38
|- align="center" bgcolor="ffbbbb"
| 97 || July 23 || @ Royals || 9 – 8 || Beckwith (3-2) || Jackson (6-2) || Quisenberry (26) || || 57-39
|- align="center" bgcolor="ffbbbb"
| 98 || July 23 || @ Royals || 7 – 2 || Wills (1-1) || Gott (5-5) || Saberhagen (1) || 31,852 || 57-40
|- align="center" bgcolor="ffbbbb"
| 99 || July 24 || @ Royals || 5 – 4 || Gubicza (7-8) || Stieb (11-4) || Quisenberry (27) || 21,607 || 57-41
|- align="center" bgcolor="ffbbbb"
| 100 || July 25 || @ Royals || 5 – 4 (13)|| Quisenberry (4-2) || Clark (0-1) || || 19,653 || 57-42
|- align="center" bgcolor="ffbbbb"
| 101 || July 27 || Rangers || 4 – 2 || Hough (11-8) || Alexander (8-5) || || 26,269 || 57-43
|- align="center" bgcolor="ffbbbb"
| 102 || July 28 || Rangers || 5 – 4 || Mason (7-9) || Jackson (6-3) || Schmidt (6) || 28,330 || 57-44
|- align="center" bgcolor="bbffbb"
| 103 || July 29 || Rangers || 6 – 2 || Stieb (12-4) || Darwin (6-6) || || 30,143 || 58-44
|- align="center" bgcolor="ffbbbb"
| 104 || July 30 || Royals || 7 – 4 || Leibrandt (5-4) || Clancy (7-11) || || 24,414 || 58-45
|- align="center" bgcolor="bbffbb"
| 105 || July 31 || Royals || 6 – 5 || Alexander (9-5) || Wills (1-2) || Gott (1) || 23,156 || 59-45
|-

|- align="center" bgcolor="bbffbb"
| 106 || August 1 || Royals || 4 – 1 || Leal (12-2) || Gura (11-8) || Gott (2) || 22,084 || 60-45
|- align="center" bgcolor="bbffbb"
| 107 || August 3 || @ Orioles || 5 – 2 || Jackson (7-3) || McGregor (12-10) || || 37,219 || 61-45
|- align="center" bgcolor="bbffbb"
| 108 || August 4 || @ Orioles || 6 – 2 || Clancy (8-11) || Flanagan (9-11) || || 37,685 || 62-45
|- align="center" bgcolor="bbffbb"
| 109 || August 5 || @ Orioles || 4 – 3 || Key (3-4) || Martinez (4-8) || Lamp (9) || 34,016 || 63-45
|- align="center" bgcolor="ffbbbb"
| 110 || August 6 || @ Rangers || 5 – 4 || Mason (8-9) || Jackson (7-4) || || 11,540 || 63-46
|- align="center" bgcolor="ffbbbb"
| 111 || August 7 || @ Rangers || 7 – 6 (10)|| Schmidt (5-4) || Lamp (4-6) || || 10,313 || 63-47
|- align="center" bgcolor="bbffbb"
| 112 || August 8 || @ Rangers || 7 – 2 || Clancy (9-11) || Darwin (6-7) || || 9,696 || 64-47
|- align="center" bgcolor="bbffbb"
| 113 || August 10 || Orioles || 2 – 0 || Alexander (10-5) || Martínez (4-6) || || 34,107 || 65-47
|- align="center" bgcolor="bbffbb"
| 114 || August 11 || Orioles || 3 – 2 || Gott (6-5) || Davis (12-5) || || 41,426 || 66-47
|- align="center" bgcolor="ffbbbb"
| 115 || August 12 || Orioles || 5 – 4 || McGregor (13-11) || Jackson (7-5) || Martinez (16) || 36,363 || 66-48
|- align="center" bgcolor="ffbbbb"
| 116 || August 13 || Orioles || 2 – 1 || Boddicker (14-8) || Clancy (9-12) || || 33,238 || 66-49
|- align="center" bgcolor="bbffbb"
| 117 || August 14 || @ Indians || 8 – 1 || Alexander (11-5) || Heaton (8-13) || || || 67-49
|- align="center" bgcolor="bbffbb"
| 118 || August 14 || @ Indians || 9 – 5 || Lamp (5-6) || Waddell (2-4) || || 6,158 || 68-49
|- align="center" bgcolor="ffbbbb"
| 119 || August 15 || @ Indians || 16 – 1 || Schulze (2-4) || Leal (12-3) || || || 68-50
|- align="center" bgcolor="ffbbbb"
| 120 || August 15 || @ Indians || 4 – 3 (13)|| Jeffcoat (4-1) || Key (3-5) || || 6,101 || 68-51
|- align="center" bgcolor="ffbbbb"
| 121 || August 16 || @ Indians || 6 – 5 || Waddell (3-4) || Lamp (5-7) || || 5,598 || 68-52
|- align="center" bgcolor="bbffbb"
| 122 || August 17 || @ White Sox || 4 – 3 || Clancy (10-12) || Hoyt (10-13) || || 29,941 || 69-52
|- align="center" bgcolor="ffbbbb"
| 123 || August 18 || @ White Sox || 7 – 6 || Roberge (3-0) || Jackson (7-6) || Agosto (7) || 34,484 || 69-53
|- align="center" bgcolor="bbffbb"
| 124 || August 19 || @ White Sox || 7 – 4 || Key (4-5) || Agosto (2-1) || || 38,839 || 70-53
|- align="center" bgcolor="ffbbbb"
| 125 || August 21 || Indians || 3 – 1 || Smith (5-4) || Stieb (12-5) || Camacho (17) || 25,253 || 70-54
|- align="center" bgcolor="ffbbbb"
| 126 || August 22 || Indians || 13 – 3 || Blyleven (14-5) || Clancy (10-13) || || 22,393 || 70-55
|- align="center" bgcolor="bbffbb"
| 127 || August 23 || Indians || 6 – 1 || Alexander (12-5) || Schulze (2-5) || || 23,407 || 71-55
|- align="center" bgcolor="bbffbb"
| 128 || August 24 || @ Twins || 6 – 2 || Leal (13-3) || Lysander (3-2) || Key (5) || 26,602 || 72-55
|- align="center" bgcolor="ffbbbb"
| 129 || August 25 || @ Twins || 5 – 4 (12)|| Castillo (2-0) || Gott (6-6) || || 23,236 || 72-56
|- align="center" bgcolor="bbffbb"
| 130 || August 26 || @ Twins || 2 – 1 || Stieb (13-5) || Schrom (4-7) || || 24,654 || 73-56
|- align="center" bgcolor="bbffbb"
| 131 || August 27 || @ Twins || 5 – 2 || Lamp (6-7) || Smithson (13-10) || Key (6) || 19,251 || 74-56
|- align="center" bgcolor="bbffbb"
| 132 || August 28 || White Sox || 7 – 6 (11)|| Clark (1-1) || Reed (0-5) || || 25,327 || 75-56
|- align="center" bgcolor="ffbbbb"
| 133 || August 29 || White Sox || 8 – 5 || Bannister (12-8) || Leal (13-4) || Spillner (2) || 25,232 || 75-57
|- align="center" bgcolor="bbffbb"
| 134 || August 30 || @ White Sox || 4 – 3 || Gott (7-6) || Seaver (12-9) || Key (7) || 22,800 || 76-57
|- align="center" bgcolor="bbffbb"
| 135 || August 31 || Twins || 7 – 0 || Stieb (14-5) || Castillo (2-1) || || 26,309 || 77-57
|-

|- align="center" bgcolor="bbffbb"
| 136 || September 1 || Twins || 12 – 4 || Lamp (7-7) || Smithson (13-11) || Jackson (9) || 26,526 || 78-57
|- align="center" bgcolor="bbffbb"
| 137 || September 2 || Twins || 6 – 0 || Alexander (13-5) || Viola (14-12) || || 31,000 || 79-57
|- align="center" bgcolor="ffbbbb"
| 138 || September 3 || @ Yankees || 2 – 0 || Cowley (6-1) || Leal (13-5) || Righetti (24) || 26,835 || 79-58
|- align="center" bgcolor="bbffbb"
| 139 || September 4 || @ Yankees || 6 – 4 || Clancy (11-13) || Armstrong (3-2) || Key (8) || 15,867 || 80-58
|- align="center" bgcolor="ffbbbb"
| 140 || September 5 || @ Yankees || 4 – 3 (10)|| Righetti (5-5) || Jackson (7-7) || || 17,383 || 80-59
|- align="center" bgcolor="ffbbbb"
| 141 || September 7 || Tigers || 7 – 4 (10)|| Hernández (9-2) || Musselman (0-1) || || 37,420 || 80-60
|- align="center" bgcolor="ffbbbb"
| 142 || September 8 || Tigers || 10 – 4 || Scherrer (1-0) || Leal (13-6) || López (13) || 41,059 || 80-61
|- align="center" bgcolor="ffbbbb"
| 143 || September 9 || Tigers || 7 – 2 || Wilcox (16-7) || Clancy (11-14) || || 37,392 || 80-62
|- align="center" bgcolor="ffbbbb"
| 144 || September 10 || Yankees || 6 – 2 || Montefusco (3-2) || Stieb (14-6) || Howell (7) || 21,176 || 80-63
|- align="center" bgcolor="bbffbb"
| 145 || September 11 || Yankees || 10 – 3 || Lamp (8-7) || Rasmussen (8-5) || Jackson (10) || 21,451 || 81-63
|- align="center" bgcolor="bbffbb"
| 146 || September 12 || Yankees || 2 – 1 || Alexander (14-5) || Niekro (16-8) || || 20,426 || 82-63
|- align="center" bgcolor="ffbbbb"
| 147 || September 13 || Yankees || 6 – 1 || Fontenot (7-8) || Leal (13-7) || || 20,681 || 82-64
|- align="center" bgcolor="bbffbb"
| 148 || September 14 || @ Tigers || 7 – 2 || Clancy (12-14) || Morris (17-11) || Key (9) || 46,040 || 83-64
|- align="center" bgcolor="ffbbbb"
| 149 || September 15 || @ Tigers || 2 – 1 || Wilcox (17-7) || Stieb (14-7) || Hernández (29) || 44,349 || 83-65
|- align="center" bgcolor="ffbbbb"
| 150 || September 16 || @ Tigers || 8 – 3 || Berenguer (9-10) || Clark (1-2) || || 45,488 || 83-66
|- align="center" bgcolor="bbffbb"
| 151 || September 17 || Red Sox || 5 – 4 || Alexander (15-5) || Ojeda (11-12) || || 18,480 || 84-66
|- align="center" bgcolor="ffbbbb"
| 152 || September 18 || Red Sox || 10 – 3 || Gale (2-3) || Leal (13-8) || || 18,399 || 84-67
|- align="center" bgcolor="ffbbbb"
| 153 || September 19 || Red Sox || 10 – 4 || Hurst (12-10) || Clancy (12-15) || Clear (8) || 23,212 || 84-68
|- align="center" bgcolor="bbffbb"
| 154 || September 20 || Brewers || 6 – 4 || Stieb (15-7) || Gibson (1-4) || Key (10) || 21,688 || 85-68
|- align="center" bgcolor="ffbbbb"
| 155 || September 21 || Brewers || 5 – 1 || Sutton (14-12) || Lamp (8-8) || || 21,147 || 85-69
|- align="center" bgcolor="bbffbb"
| 156 || September 22 || Brewers || 2 – 1 || Alexander (16-5) || Haas (9-11) || || 26,152 || 86-69
|- align="center" bgcolor="ffbbbb"
| 157 || September 23 || Brewers || 8 – 5 || Kern (1-0) || Jackson (7-8) || Searage (6) || 28,550 || 86-70
|- align="center" bgcolor="bbffbb"
| 158 || September 24 || @ Red Sox || 9 – 8 || Clancy (13-15) || Hurst (12-11) || Musselman (1) || 13,328 || 87-70
|- align="center" bgcolor="ffbbbb"
| 159 || September 25 || @ Red Sox || 14 – 6 || Nipper (11-6) || Stieb (15-8) || || 14,259 || 87-71
|- align="center" bgcolor="bbffbb"
| 160 || September 26 || @ Red Sox || 8 – 4 || Alexander (17-5) || Boyd (12-11) || || 13,065 || 88-71
|- align="center" bgcolor="ffbbbb"
| 161 || September 28 || @ Brewers || 4 – 3 (11)|| Searage (2-1) || Musselman (0-2) || || 17,026 || 88-72
|- align="center" bgcolor="bbffbb"
| 162 || September 29 || @ Brewers || 5 – 4 || Stieb (16-8) || Cocanower (8-16) || || 9,736 || 89-72
|- align="center" bgcolor="ffbbbb"
| 163 || September 30 || @ Brewers || 4 – 0 || Gibson (2-5) || Alexander (17-6) || || 10,277 || 89-73
|-

Player stats

Batting

Starters by position
Note: Pos = Position; G = Games played; AB = At bats; R = Runs scored; H = Hits; 2B = Doubles; 3B = Triples; Avg. = Batting average; HR = Home runs; RBI = Runs batted in; SB = Stolen bases

Other batters
Note: G = Games played; AB = At bats; R = Runs scored; H = Hits; 2B = Doubles; 3B = Triples; Avg. = Batting average; HR = Home runs; RBI = Runs batted in; SB = Stolen bases

Pitching

Starting pitchers
Note: G = Games pitched; GS = Games started; IP = Innings pitched; W = Wins; L = Losses; ERA = Earned run average; R = Runs allowed; ER = Earned runs allowed; BB = Walks allowed; K = Strikeouts

Other pitchers
Note: G = Games pitched; GS = Games started; IP = Innings pitched; W = Wins; L = Losses; SV = Saves; ERA = Earned run average; R = Runs allowed; ER = Earned runs allowed; BB = Walks allowed; K = Strikeouts

Relief pitchers
Note: G = Games pitched; IP = Innings pitched; W = Wins; L = Losses; SV = Saves; ERA = Earned run average; R = Runs allowed; ER = Earned runs allowed; BB = Walks allowed; K = Strikeouts

Award winners
Doyle Alexander, Pitcher of the Month Award, September
Dave Collins, American League Leader, Triples, 15
Lloyd Moseby, American League Leader, Triples, 15

All-Star Game
Dámaso García, second base
 Alfredo Griffin, shortstop
 Dave Stieb, pitcher

Farm system

Notes

External links
1984 Toronto Blue Jays at Baseball Reference
1984 Toronto Blue Jays at Baseball Almanac

Toronto Blue Jays seasons
Toronto Blue Jays season
1984 in Canadian sports
1984 in Toronto